The Philanthropist is an American action drama television series that aired on NBC from June 24 to August 12, 2009. The program was a limited summer series, principally filmed in South Africa. It opened to strong ratings, but saw a drop in viewers in subsequent weeks. The Philanthropist is a Carnival Films production in association with The Levinson/Fontana Company and Original Media. Tom Fontana, Barry Levinson, Peter Horton, Charlie Corwin, Gareth Neame, and Teri Weinberg served as executive producers.

On October 21, 2009, NBC cancelled the series after one season.

Synopsis
The title character, Teddy Rist (portrayed by James Purefoy), is a billionaire playboy haunted by the death of his only child. His life changes when he rescues a young boy during a hurricane in Nigeria. As a result, Rist begins using his fortune to personally change the lives of others. The Philanthropist is based loosely on the life of Bobby Sager.

Cast and characters

Main

 James Purefoy as Teddy Rist – a British billionaire, driven to do good works after the death of his son
 Neve Campbell as Olivia Maidstone – Philip's wife, who runs the company's charitable foundation
 Michael Kenneth Williams as Dax, an Iraq war veteran and Teddy's bodyguard
 Lindy Booth as A.J. Butterfield – the director of special projects at Maidstone-Rist

Recurring
 Jesse L. Martin as Philip Maidstone – the co-CEO of Rist's company and best friend to Teddy
 Krista Allen as Julia Carson Rist – Teddy's ex-wife
 James Albrecht as Gerard Kim – Teddy's personal assistant

Episodes

Reception

U.S. ratings

Critical reception 
On review aggregator Rotten Tomatoes, the first season has an approval rating of 61% based on 23 reviews, with an average score of 6.5/10; the critical consensus reads: "Though it stumbles on its James Bond-esque premise, The Philanthropist is saved by its beautiful cinematography and the enigmatic charisma of its main star, James Purefoy." On Metacritic, the first season has a weighted average score of 60 out of 100 based on 17 critics, indicating "mixed or average reviews".

Non-US showings and re-airings
In December 2010 and January 2011, the show was aired in Australia on 7Two, a Seven Network digital channel. In August 2013 started on polish TVP1.

Home media releases
The complete series was released on January 5, 2010 on DVD in Region 1. It was released as a two-disc set, with a total running time of 300 minutes.

Inspiration
The Philanthropist is inspired by the hands-on philanthropy of Bobby Sager.

References

External links
 
 Original music by Jose Villalobos

2000s American drama television series
2009 American television series debuts
2009 American television series endings
English-language television shows
NBC original programming
Television series by Universal Television
Television shows set in South Africa
Television series created by Tom Fontana